Thomas Enqvist defeated the defending champion Richard Krajicek in the final, 6–1, 6–4, 5–7, 7–5 to win the singles tennis title at the 1999 Eurocard Open.

Seeds
A champion seed is indicated in bold text while text in italics indicates the round in which that seed was eliminated. All sixteen seeds received a bye into the second round.

  Andre Agassi (semifinals)
  Yevgeny Kafelnikov (second round)
  Todd Martin (quarterfinals)
  Gustavo Kuerten (third round)
  Greg Rusedski (semifinals)
  Marcelo Ríos (quarterfinals)
  Nicolas Kiefer (second round)
  Richard Krajicek (final)
  Álex Corretja (third round)
  Tim Henman (second round)
  Tommy Haas (third round)
  Nicolás Lapentti (third round)
  Thomas Enqvist (champion)
  Cédric Pioline (second round)
  Karol Kučera (second round)
  Magnus Norman (third round)

Draw

Finals

Top half

Section 1

Section 2

Bottom half

Section 3

Section 4

Qualifying

Qualifying seeds

Qualifiers

Qualifying draw

First qualifier

Second qualifier

Third qualifier

Fourth qualifier

Fifth qualifier

Sixth qualifier

References

External links 
 Official results archive (ATP)
 Official results archive (ITF)

Singles